Başak Eraydın was the defending champion, but lost in the first round to Ilona Georgiana Ghioroaie.

Sabina Sharipova won the title, defeating Elena Rybakina in the final, 7–6(7–0), 6–4.

Seeds

Draw

Finals

Top half

Bottom half

References
Main Draw

Lale Cup - Singles